Suchá Hora (also known by other names) is a village and municipality in Tvrdošín District in the Žilina Region of northern Slovakia.

History
The village was founded in the mid 16th century based on Wallachian Law. 

From 1920-1924 and shortly in 1939 the village belonged to Poland.

Etymology and other names
The oldest mention of the village is from 1566 as "Zucha" and from 1588 it has been known as Suchá Hora (In Slovak). The name of the village means dry mountain.

The village is known as "Sucha Góra" in Polish, occasionally as "Sucha Góra Orawska" (Orawska meaning Oravian, referring to the region of Orava/Orawa).

The village is known as "Szuchahora" in Hungarian.

Geography
The municipality lies at an altitude of 790 metres and covers an area of 21.855 km². It has a population of about 1,290 people.

Suchá Hora is located in the historical region of Orava.

Other locations 
 1228 metres high mountain near Banská Bystrica. Site of an FM- and TV-transmitter.

References

External links
http://www.suchahora.eu

Sources
"Suchá Hora - História". e-obce.sk (in Slovak). Retrieved October 1, 2020.

Villages and municipalities in Tvrdošín District